The Doterel class was a Royal Navy class of screw-driven sloops. They were of composite construction, with wooden hulls over an iron frame. Two of the class were lost, one to an explosion off Chile and one wrecked off Canada. Gannet is preserved at Chatham Historic Dockyard.

Design
The Nathaniel Barnaby design was a development of William Henry White's 1874 .  The graceful clipper bow of the Opsreys was replaced by a vertical stem and the engines were more powerful. They were of composite construction, with wooden hulls over an iron frame.

Propulsion

Armament
They were armed with two 7-inch (90cwt) muzzle-loading rifled guns on pivoting mounts, and four 64-pounder muzzle-loading rifled guns (two on pivoting mounts, and two broadside). Four machine guns and one light gun completed the weaponry.

Sail plan
All the ships of the class were provided with a barque rig, that is, square-rigged foremast and mainmast, and fore-and aft sails only on the mizzen mast.

Crew
They had a complement of approximately 140 men.

Ships

References

Sloop classes
 
 Doterel
Auxiliary gateship classes